The 1961 Indonesian census was the first census of Indonesia as a sovereign state. With a total population of 97,018,829, Indonesia was the world's fifth-most populous country at the time. The census covered all territories in the country, but no enumeration was done in Indonesian-claimed Western New Guinea because it was under Dutch occupation. Instead, an estimated population for the region was included in the final census numbers.

As the first census since 1930, when Indonesia was still a colony of the Netherlands, its data was used for planning the nation's future development. One-third of the country's population was under the age of ten, and 65 percent of the population lived on the island of Java, which had been considered overpopulated as early as the 1930s. Demographers highlighted that the large proportion of young people presented a demographic challenge. Given that as many as one-fifth of rural youths were already unemployed, there was a question of whether Indonesia would be able to absorb a future surge of new workers. Agriculture was the dominant industry, employing 72 percent of workers. The census also collected data on school attendance to facilitate education planning. Just under half of the population aged ten and older could read and write in either Latin characters or a non-Latin script.

About 350,000 enumerators were enlisted by census officials at the Central Bureau of Statistics and at the provincial, regency, and district levels. Fields operations began in February 1961, with enumeration and final verification being conducted in October. Tabulation was conducted at the Central Bureau of Statistics and at the provincial level, but only data for three provinces were ever processed completely. Data for the rest of Indonesia were drawn from a one-percent sample tabulation of census returns, and many of the original census results have since been lost.

Background 
The 1961 census was the first census in Indonesia after independence from the Netherlands. The 1930 Dutch East Indies census was the previous census completed and enumerated a total population of 60,727,233. A census had been planned for 1940, but it was canceled because of World War II. Based on the assumption of a constant rate of growth from the 1930 census, the official population estimate for 1940 was 70.4 million. A subsequent estimate in 1950—this time compiled from civil registration records held by local village heads—placed the population at 77.2 million. However, population records in parts of Java and in the rest of the country at the time were often deficient, and data compilation methods were inconsistent; therefore, the reliability of this estimate has come into question.

In 1953, the United Nations Statistical Commission and Population Commission began encouraging UN member countries to take and complete their national censuses in and around 1960 under a new set of statistical methods. In response, the Djuanda Cabinet created Indonesia's Central Bureau of Statistics through an ordinance in January 1958 and mandated it to prepare a census to be held in 1960 or 1961. The legislature, the People's Representative Council of Mutual Aid, repealed a Dutch-era census law in the name of national planning and development, and Law No. 6 of 1960 on the Census became the new legal basis of the census.

Enumeration and tabulation 

Census day was officially designated as 31 October 1961. To facilitate operations, the Central Bureau of Statistics established a census office in each province, and provincial governors were appointed ex officio directors of census operations. Provincial office staff were trained directly by the bureau, and they, in turn, trained census officials at the regency level. The chain continued down to the district level, where enumerators and their supervisors were trained. In total, the census enlisted about 350,000 enumerators and 50,000 supervisors.

Preparations began three years prior with the drawing of enumeration districts and conducting of experimental surveys to simulate the census. Field operations began in February 1961 with the listing and verification of households. Approximately 200,000 enumeration districts were set up, with each district containing about 100 households. These activities continued into October, and the actual population enumeration took place that same month. Enumerators canvassed households—about 57 households per enumerator—and verified their information. In South Sulawesi, enumeration was delayed until December because of security concerns during the Permesta Rebellion. Between 19 and 31 October, enumerators revisited all households to conduct a final check for new births, deaths, and other changes since the household was first canvassed. Individuals not present during canvassing because of their employment and those who had been away from home for less than three months were enumerated at their place of origin.

The census used an individual schedule and a household schedule. The individual schedule collected information on a person's name, relationship to the head of household, sex, age, marital status, nationality, religion, language, place of birth, education, and school attendance. For individuals aged ten or older, the schedule collected information on literacy, type of activity, primary occupation, industry, status in industry, secondary occupation, and the number of births to every married woman. The household scheduled contained separate topics for industrial establishments, institutional households, and private households. For private households, the schedule also captured the type of house and agricultural information.

Tabulation of schedules was done in two groups. Schedules from all urban regions and 10 percent of schedules from rural regions were processed mechanically by the Central Bureau of Statistics. The remaining 90 percent of rural schedules were tabulated manually at the provincial level. The first provisional results were released in December 1961. This was followed six months later by data on each regency and municipality throughout the country. Only data for three provinces (Jakarta, Yogyakarta, and East Java) were ever processed completely, and data for the rest of the country were drawn from a one-percent sample tabulation of census returns. Many of the detailed results have since been lost.

Population data 
The census yielded a total population of 97,018,829, a nearly 60-percent increase from the 1930 census. This number made Indonesia the world's fifth-most populous country, behind the People's Republic of China (669 million in 1958), India (438 million in 1961), the Soviet Union (214 million in 1960), and the United States (182 million in 1961). The overall sex ratio was 95 males per 100 females. Although the census covered all territories of the country, no enumeration was done in Indonesian-claimed Western New Guinea, which remained under Dutch occupation. Instead, the results included an estimated population of 700,000 for that region.

Geographical distribution 
A main feature of the population of Indonesia is the disparity of population density among its islands. Nearly 65 percent of the total population lived on the island of Java, which only accounts for 6.9 percent of the total area of the country. Java was already widely considered to be overpopulated as early as the 1930s. On the other hand, Kalimantan, which accounts for 28 percent of total area, was inhabited by only 4.2 percent of the total population. The ratio of Java's population to the total population decreased from the 1930 census, indicating a smaller rate of growth compared to other islands. Sumatra and Kalimantan, for example, nearly doubled their population from 1930.

Municipalities and capitals of regencies were categorized as urban areas in the census. The proportion of the population living in these regions nearly doubled between 1930 (7.5 percent) and 1961 (almost 15 percent), pointing to a pattern of migration from the countryside to cities that was observed in the post-war period among developing countries. Two-thirds of this urban population were in Java. Cities grew rapidly because of their anticipated economic opportunities and population pressures in rural areas. The capital city of Jakarta, whose population was 533,000 in 1930, had its boundaries extended in 1950 and grew to 2.97 million. Bandung, in West Java, exceeded that growth rate and grew to a population of almost 1 million, while Surabaya, in East Java, saw its population triple to more than 1 million. Other major cities that grew since the previous census included Semarang (Central Java), Medan (North Sumatra), Palembang (South Sumatra), Makassar (South Sulawesi), Surakarta (Central Java), Malang (East Java), and Yogyakarta.

Age distribution 

A very high percentage of the population (33.6 percent) were children under the age of ten, a reflection of declining infant and child mortality in the 1950s attributed to significant reductions in cases of yaws, tuberculosis, and malaria, and better food availability and nutrition compared to the 1940s. Of the total population, 55.3 percent were of working age (ages 15–64). This proportion was higher in Java (56.5 percent) and in urban areas (57.6 percent). Demographer  theorized that the flat population distribution between ages ten and thirty-five was an economic disadvantage for Indonesia in the 1950s. A more normal distribution would have provided the country with a larger working population. Overall, the dependency ratio was 81 dependent persons per 100 working individuals. Combining age data with urban–rural distribution data showed an influx of younger workers to urban centers. The 15–24 age group had greater representation in cities (20 percent of the urban population) than in the countryside (15 percent of the rural population).

Labor and economy 

The labor force in 1961 accounted for approximately 54 percent of the population aged ten and older, about 34.6 million in total. They comprised individuals who worked at least two out of the six months preceding the census and those who were unemployed but seeking work. The average unemployment rate stood at 5.4 percent. Three-fourths of all employed persons were males. The female labor participation rate was less than half of the male population. Female unemployment was higher at 7.0 percent, compared to 4.8 percent for males. In Jakarta, the unemployment rate exceeded 7 percent. Although urban areas had a higher percentage of unemployment than rural areas, underemployment was a serious concern in rural areas. Among agricultural workers in rural areas of Java and Madura, as many as one-third were underemployed. At the same time, rural areas also saw a majority of females being engaged in both homemaking and another economic activity simultaneously.

Agriculture (including forestry and fishing) was the dominant industry, employing nearly 72 percent of workers, whereas manufacturing employed less than 6 percent. The share of workers in agriculture showed little or no change relative to 1930. Java had the lowest percentage of workers in the agriculture sector, but it had the highest percentage employed in manufacturing, trade, and services. In urban areas, one-third workers were employed in the services sector, whereas manufacturing only employed one-sixth of urban workers. In rural areas, agriculture comprised 81 percent of workers. Although trade and services accounted for less than 5 percent and less than 6 percent of rural workers, respectively, those engaged in agriculture likely considered these their secondary economic activities. Approximately 1 million children aged 10–14 were in employment (3.4 percent of the employed labor force), with agriculture making up 87 percent of that group's economic activities.

Literacy and education 

The literacy rate for persons aged ten and older was 46.7 percent. This figure included those who were able to read and write in either Latin characters or in a non-Latin script such as Javanese, Arabic, or Chinese. Individuals who could read but not write were categorized as illiterate. Literacy in Sumatra was higher, at 56.6 percent, than other geographic regions. Among males, this figure reached almost 70 percent. In Java, the overall literacy rate was 45.5 percent. In urban areas, two-thirds of persons aged ten and older were literate, whereas rural areas had a literacy rate of 43 percent. The introduction of literacy campaigns in years prior to the census resulted a smaller gap in literacy between males and females in the youngest age groups. About 72 percent of children aged 10–14 (76.2 percent of males and 67.7 percent of females) could read and write.

In rural areas, almost 70 percent of those ten years and older have never completed primary school. This figure was 42 percent in urban areas. Sumatra had the highest percentage of population aged ten and older who completed primary education at almost 40 percent, as well as the highest percentage who finished some higher school at 4.2 percent. In Java, only 30.5 percent of persons aged ten and older had completed primary school, and 3.2 percent completed education at a higher school. The proportion of persons who completed primary school increased for younger age groups. Among all individuals who completed primary school, the 10–24 age group accounted for 56.1 percent.

Most Indonesian children started school at the age of seven or older. To facilitate education planning, the Central Bureau of Statistics created a separate table of school attendance figures among children aged seven to thirteen. On average, school attendance in this group was about 55 percent, with three-fourths of children in urban areas and just over half of children in rural areas attending school. Although attendance rates for males and females did not differ greatly within each region, there was a larger discrepancy among females of different regions than among males.

Subsequent analyses

Gaps in ethnographic data 

Unlike the previous census completed in 1930, the 1961 census did not capture information on Indonesia's ethnic groups. No ethnicity data was collected by successive governments from independence through the 1990s because they believed that information about the country's ethnic composition could be used to incite social and political instability. Such data would not be collected until the 2000 census following democratization and reforms in 1998. As a result, analyses of ethnic groupings at the national level throughout most of the 20th century were either extrapolated from 1930 data or educated estimates.

Demographers have noted that this position on ethnicity differed from the government's attitude toward religion, whose information has been collected in all population censuses. Even so, religion was considered a sensitive topic that the complete 1961 data was never made public. The Central Bureau of Statistics only released statistics on religion for Jakarta, while researchers later obtained unpublished data for Yogyakarta and East Java.

Population projections 

A post-enumeration survey was conducted in the same year as the census throughout Java, but only in the provincial capitals for other islands. It found that Java had a net underenumeration of 0.19 percent, whereas the other provincial capitals had a net underenumeration of 0.45 percent. In Jakarta, data on the distribution of population by single year of age showed a tendency of age heaping at ages ending with zero and five and at ages twelve and eighteen. There were also patterns of underenumeration of very young children, overestimation of the ages of old people, and understatements of ages by young females—all commonly seen in population censuses. Economist Widjojo Nitisastro, who headed National Development Planning Agency (or Bappenas), applied adjustments to the sex-age data to make population projections through 1991. Demographic surveys were also conducted in each of the subsequent three years. Census planners used information from the completed census and surveys to make improvements to the following census in 1971.

Given the large proportion of population aged 5–14, demographer Nathan Keyfitz estimated that the number of people entering the labor force would rise from 1.5 million annually in the mid 1960s to over 3 million annually in the early 1970s, raising the question of whether the Indonesian economy could absorb the surge of new workers. He highlighted that the census already showed that as much as one-fifth of young people in rural areas were already unemployed. He anticipated population pressures in land-scarce Java, which was three-quarters rural. Economist Alex Hunter noted that the former Dutch colonial government attempted to solve this problem by introducing a transmigration program to move landless people to less populous outer islands, but the program saw little success among the Javanese. Keyfitz predicted instead that rural-to-urban migration would accelerate, continuing the pattern of rapid growth in cities seen in the census. Demographer Gavin Jones agreed that rural-urban migration was more practical, but noted that "dismal economic performance" in the first half of the 1960s resulted in poor employment opportunities and living conditions in urban areas.

See also 
 Demographics of Indonesia
 Economic history of Indonesia

References

Citations

Bibliography

Statutes and ordinances

External links 
 Population Census 1961, a booklet published in June 1962 containing provisional census figures for each regency and municipality in Indonesia

Indonesia
1961 in Indonesia
Censuses in Indonesia